Gioele is a masculine Italian given name. Notable people with the name include:

Gioele Bertolini (born 1995), Italian cyclist
Gioele Celerino (born 1993), Italian rugby league player
Gioele Dix (born 1956), Italian actor and comedian
Gioele Pellino (born 1983), Italian motorcycle racer

Italian masculine given names